Křižanov may refer to the following places in the Czech Republic:
 Křižanov (Písek District), village
 Křižanov (Žďár nad Sázavou District), market town
 Křižanov Highlands, mountain range in Moravia